Cherokee cultural citizenship refers to status accorded to everyone who belongs to the Cherokee Nation.

Cultural citizenship definition 

Cultural citizenship psychologically and ideologically connects members within a community or members of different communities through a sense of common belonging, a reciprocal recognition of belonging, and shared experiences of daily life. Cultural citizenship consists of implications in language, literature, education, art, religion, and additional facets of culture. Cultural citizenship does not replace legal or political concepts of citizenship. Instead, cultural citizenship works in tandem with legal and political notions of citizenship to create a comprehensive understanding of how individuals identify themselves and their own belonging within a community or nation state. Unlike legal or political notions of citizenship, the emic approach to cultural citizenship does not restrict people to geographical boundaries or political entities. Shared aspects of culture facilitate belonging and citizenship on a global scale.

Application to the Cherokee Nation 

In the nineteenth century, the United States used the concept of legal citizenship as a way to exclude racial and religious minorities from politics and complete inclusion in American society. The federal and state governments excluded the Cherokee Nation from admission to legal United States citizenship based on racist presumptions and irrational stereotypes that questioned the intelligence and capacity of the Cherokee. Three landmark court cases reflect the categorical exclusion of the Cherokee from citizenship and sovereignty based on false, racist assumptions: Johnson v. M'Intosh, Cherokee Nation v. Georgia, and Worcester v. Georgia.

The United States only proffered the Cherokee opportunities for admission to legal citizenship on one specific, limited occasion following the 1817 Treaty of the Cherokee Agency. The treaty initiated the commencement of Cherokee removal westward and provided lawful citizenry and land allotments to Cherokee individuals who left tribal territories and abandoned tribal membership and affiliations. In the Treaty of 1817, the United States did not culturally identify with the Cherokee or reciprocate a sense of community or belonging. The motivations of the treaty were strictly manipulative for obtainment of strategically and economically valuable tribal lands.

While the federal and state governments eliminated possibilities of lawful citizenry through legislative proceedings and treaty enactments, the Cherokee overall held little to no desire to obtain United States legal citizenship. The Cherokee established their complete disinterest in obtaining United States lawful citizenry, regardless of any racial, political, or cultural bans Americans previously imposed upon the Nation during the Cherokee Nation v. Georgia court proceedings. The Cherokee proclaimed the tribe was "a foreign State, not owing allegiance to the United States, nor to any state of this Union, nor to any prince, potentate or State, other than their own." The primary issue of concern for the Cherokee in the early nineteenth century surrounded political and territorial sovereignty over tribal lands, not admission into United States citizenship. The only status of citizenry that the Cherokee valued was their own tribal membership separate from that of any state or nation that the geographical boundaries of the tribal territory aligned with. As the United States, and particularly the state of Georgia, wielded legal restrictions against social and political inclusion of the Cherokee, the Cherokee in turn ideologically conceptualized citizenship detached from standing lawful notions of citizenship.

The Cherokee Nation indeed possessed their own standards of lawful citizenry, primarily concerning slave status and the freedman controversy, but also demonstrated and valued cultural and ideological concepts of citizenship. The Cherokee indicated the importance and cultural value of apolitical citizenship through a global, cultural conception of citizenship. The global, cultural citizenship of the Cherokee was perceived and exhibited through literature, language, and education, a global awareness and interest, and international political involvement and concern. The Cherokee ideology of a global, cultural citizenship fundamentally invalidated the United States perception of the Cherokee as an intellectually isolated people who were incapable of comprehending civilization beyond the geographical tribal boundaries.

References

Cherokee culture
Citizenship
United States nationality law